Lemyra nigricosta is a moth of the family Erebidae. It was described by Thomas in 1990. It is found in Taiwan.

References

 

nigricosta
Moths described in 1990